Listed below are the largest lakes and seas on various worlds in the Solar System. The table includes single bodies of water or other liquid on or near the surface of a solid body (terrestrial planet, planetoid, or moon). All objects on this list are expected to be round, hence anything that is part of a belt or disc is expected to be a dwarf planet.

Cold surface oceans or lakes are found on two worlds, Earth and Saturn's moon Titan. Lava lakes are found on Earth and Jupiter's moon Io. Subsurface oceans or seas occur on the other Galilean moons of Jupiter, Saturn's moons Titan and Enceladus, and are suspected to exist on the some of Saturn's other moons, the asteroid Ceres, the larger trans-Neptunian objects, and ice planets in planetary systems. Recent analysis of the interior of Ganymede (the largest moon of Jupiter), taking into account the effects of salt, suggests that it and some of the other icy bodies may not have a single interior global ocean but several stacked ones, separated by different phases of ice, with the lowest liquid layer adjacent to the rocky mantle below.
In June 2020, NASA scientists reported that it is likely that exoplanets with oceans may be common in the Milky Way galaxy, based on mathematical modeling studies of their internal heating rates. The majority of such worlds would probably have subsurface oceans, similar to those of the icy moons Europa and Enceladus.


List

See also

 List of Solar System extremes
 List of tallest mountains in the Solar System
 List of largest rifts, canyons and valleys in the Solar System
 List of largest craters in the Solar System
Hydrosphere
List of lakes by area

Notes

References

External links
 JPL Ocean Worlds infographic

 

Lakes and seas, largest in the Solar System
Lakes and seas
Seas
Solar System